The 2019 Scottish Challenge Cup final, also known as the IRN-BRU Cup final for sponsorship reasons, was a football match that took place on 23 March 2019, between Ross County and Connah's Quay Nomads. It was the 28th final of the Scottish Challenge Cup since it was first organised in 1990 to celebrate the centenary of the now defunct Scottish Football League, and the sixth since the SPFL was formed. Connah's Quay became the first club from outside Scotland to reach the final since the competition was first expanded to include guest teams from other countries in 2016–17.

Route to the final

The competition is a knock-out tournament and was contested by 58 teams from Scotland, England, Wales, Northern Ireland and the Republic of Ireland in 2018–19. Two teams from the English National League (fifth tier) were added to the competition in 2018–19, following the addition of teams from Wales and Northern Ireland in 2016–17 and the Republic of Ireland in 2017–18.

Ross County

Connah's Quay Nomads
As one of the guest teams from Wales, Connah's Quay Nomads received a bye to the second round.

Match details

References

Scottish Challenge Cup Finals
Scottish Challenge Cup Final 2019
Challenge Cup Final
3
Scottish Challenge Cup Final